Stephen John Watts (born 1 May 1979) is a former English cricketer. Watts was a right-handed batsman who bowled right-arm off break. He was born in Luton, Bedfordshire.

Watts made his debut for Bedfordshire in the 2001 Minor Counties Championship against Staffordshire. Watts played Minor counties cricket for Bedfordshire from 2001 to 2006, which included 22 Minor Counties Championship matches and 7 MCCA Knockout Trophy matches. He made his List A debut against Cheshire in the 1st round of the 2004 Cheltenham & Gloucester Trophy which was held in 2003. In this match, he scored an unbeaten 4 runs and bowled 4 wicket-less overs. He played a further List A match for Bedfordshire, in the 2005 Cheltenham & Gloucester Trophy against Sussex. In this match, he scored an unbeaten 3 runs. With the ball, he bowled 5 wicket-less overs.

References

External links

1979 births
Living people
Cricketers from Luton
English cricketers
Bedfordshire cricketers